Moazzam Jah Ansari is a grade 22 officer of the Police Service of Pakistan who is serving as Inspector General of Khyber Pakhtunkhwa Police since June 2021. He previously has served as the Commandant of the Frontier Constabulary (CFC/IGFC) and Inspector General of Balochistan Police, Pakistan.

Mr. Ansari holds a master's degree in International Relations and is the recipient of Quaid e Azam Police Medal (QPM), the highest police gallantry award of the country and has also been awarded the UN police medal. He is a graduate of the National Defence University Islamabad. Ansari has previously served as the Joint Director General Intelligence Bureau (Balochistan), Deputy Inspector General of Police (DIG) Gwadar and Director FIA in Sindh. He has also held various command positions including Senior Superintendent of Police in Punjab, KPK and Sindh.

See also
Central Superior Services
Frontier Constabulary
Balochistan Police
Federal Investigation Agency
Police Service of Pakistan

References

Inspector Generals of Khyber Pakhtunkhwa Police
Pakistani police officers
1965 births
Living people
Recipients of Quaid-e-Azam Police Medal
IGPs of Khyber Pakhtunkhwa Police
Inspector Generals of Balochistan Police